Britney Spears: In the Zone is the sixth video album and first extended play (EP) by American singer Britney Spears. It was released on April 6, 2004, by Jive Records, accompanying her fourth studio album In the Zone (2003).

Britney Spears: In the Zone contains her American Broadcasting Company (ABC) concert special of the same title, as well as footage from live performances to promote In the Zone. Its DVD also includes the accompanying music videos for "Me Against the Music" and "Toxic", while its four-track CD includes previously unreleased tracks. Upon its release, the video received mixed reviews from critics. It debuted atop the US Top Music Videos and was certified double platinum by the Recording Industry Association of America (RIAA).

Recording and production
"Don't Hang Up" and "The Answer", which appeared on the North American edition of the CD of Britney Spears: In the Zone, originally appeared as bonus tracks on international editions of In the Zone (2003). Spears wrote "Don't Hang Up" along with its producers Brian Kierulf and Josh Schwartz, while "The Answer" was written and produced by Sean Combs and Ryan Leslie. The tracks were replaced by the Bloodshy & Avant-produced "I've Just Begun (Having My Fun)" and Linda Perry-written and produced "Girls and Boys" on the international edition of the video. Both were originally recorded for In the Zone but failed to make the cut. "I've Just Begun (Having My Fun)" initially appeared as a bonus digital download on the Walmart exclusive edition of In the Zone, before being included on Spears' first greatest hits album Greatest Hits: My Prerogative in November 2004.

"Sippin' On", under its original title "Tell Me What You're Sippin' On", was also originally recorded for In the Zone. After failing to make the cut, it was then set to be included on select editions of Britney Spears: In the Zone but was omitted. The mid-tempo R&B track was written by Spears and produced by Tricky Stewart. Spears later considered including a new version of the song featuring vocals from rapper AC on her fifth studio album Blackout (2007). Website DJBooth reviewed the song by saying: "The mid-tempo track has the same familiar drum pattern as Nas' "I Can"; except here lyricism has been replaced by sexiness. After all, come the end of the song Britney does a 'soul clap'." Another review noted an influence from Janet Jackson. The second version leaked via a Blackout demo CD, while the original surfaced in September 2011.

Release
In November 2003, Billboard announced that Spears planned to release a video album with previously unreleased footage in mid-March 2004. On February 26, MTV reported that the video would concentrate on the live performances to promote In the Zone (2003), such as her performances of "Me Against the Music" and "(I Got That) Boom Boom" on Total Request Live and the half-hour surprise appearance at the Palms Casino Resort's Rain Nightclub. Originally set to be released on March 23, Britney Spears: In the Zone was later pushed back to April 6, and was released as a DVD+CD set.

The DVD of Britney Spears: In the Zone also included her American Broadcasting Company (ABC) concert special of the same name, which had aired on November 17, 2003. Filmed at the Gotham Hall in New York City in October, the show featured stage settings evoking Cabaret. The video also contained the accompanying music videos for "Me Against the Music" and "Toxic", alongside the latter's episode of Making the Video. The North American edition CD included "Don't Hang Up" and "The Answer", whereas international editions included the tracks "I've Just Begun (Having My Fun)" and "Girls and Boys".

Critical reception
Britney Spears: In the Zone received mixed reviews from critics. Aaron Beierle of DVD Talk highlighted the concert special, but said that the interviews and behind-the-scenes footage "are geared clearly towards promoting the album and, while they achieve that goal, they break up the momentum of the concert terribly." He summarized his review by saying: "In the Zone does disappoint somewhat with the audio, but the video quality is good. Recommended for fans."

Accolades

|-
! scope="row"| 2005
| Japan Gold Disc Award
| International Music Videos of the Year
| Britney Spears: In the Zone
| 
| align="center"| 
|}

Commercial performance
In the United States, Britney Spears: In the Zone debuted atop the US Top Music Videos chart dated April 24, 2004. On May 11, it was certified double platinum by the Recording Industry Association of America (RIAA) for shipments of 200,000 copies. Across Latin America, the video was certified platinum in Argentina and gold in Brazil and Mexico. In France, it was certified platinum by the Syndicat National de l'Édition Phonographique (SNEP), for shipments of 15,000 copies. In Australia, it was certified gold by the Australian Recording Industry Association (ARIA) for shipments of 7,500 units. In Japan, the video peaked at number seven on the Oricon video chart, spending 29 weeks charting.

Track listing

Notes
  signifies a co-producer
  signifies a remix producer

Charts

Certifications

Release history

References

External links
 
 
 

Britney Spears video albums
2004 video albums
Jive Records video albums
Britney Spears live albums
Live video albums
Jive Records live albums
2004 live albums